The 1958 Macdonald Brier, the Canadian men's national curling championship, was held from March 3 to 7, 1958 at Victoria Memorial Arena in Victoria, British Columbia. A total of 36,000 fans attended the event.

Both Team Alberta and Team Manitoba finished round robin play tied for first with 8-2 records, necessitating a tiebreaker playoff for the Brier championship between the two teams. Alberta, who was skipped by Matt Baldwin won the Brier Tankard for the second year in a row as they defeated Manitoba 10–6 in the tiebreaker game. This was Alberta's seventh Brier championship and the third time Baldwin had won the Brier as a skip, which tied Ken Watson for the most Brier championships as a skip. In addition, Baldwin joined Gordon Hudson as the only skips to win back-to-back Briers as Hudson accomplished the feat in 1928 and 1929.

The runner-up Manitoba rink, consisting of curlers who were 18 years old or under set a couple of Brier records. At 18 years old, skip Terry Braunstein is to date, still youngest curler to ever skip a team at the Brier. At 16 years of age, lead John Van Hellemond (brother of Hockey Hall of Fame referee Andy Van Hellemond) became the youngest curler to ever participate at a Brier. Van Hellemond's record stood until 2022 when 15 year old Nicholas Codner from Team Newfoundland and Labrador subbed in for the final two ends in their match against Alberta. Van Hellemond's participation in the 1958 Brier resulted in a ban of junior curlers at the Brier for nearly 60 years.

Event Summary 
Heading into Thursday evening's draw, Alberta and Ontario were tied for first in the standings with a 6–1 record. Manitoba, who had started the Brier by losing two of the first three games had came back and stood one game behind both Alberta and Ontario with a 5–2 record. Both British Columbia and Saskatchewan had an outside chance as they were 4-3 and 5-3 respectively with the loser of their game in the Thursday evening draw being eliminated.

In that Thursday evening draw (Draw 9), Manitoba would defeat and draw even with Ontario with a 13–7 win while Alberta defeated Newfoundland 10–5 to remain in first place. British Columbia eliminated Saskatchewan from Brier contention with a 14–6 win. Heading into the final day of competition, Alberta led with a 7–1 record with Manitoba and Ontario tied with 6-2 records and BC was sitting at 5-3 and needing some help to stay alive.

In the Friday morning draw (Draw 10), Manitoba would keep rolling by beating Nova Scotia 10-7 while British Columbia beat Quebec by an identical 10-7 result that would keep them alive. Alberta would lose to Ontario 10-6 as Alberta skip Matt Baldwin was suffering from the flu and did not perform as well. Thus the final draw would have a lot of drama as there was a high possibility that a tiebreaker would be needed to decide the Brier as Alberta, Manitoba, and Ontario were all 7-2 while BC was sitting at 6-3 and needed a win and losses by all three of the 7-2 teams to be in the tiebreaker.

The final draw on Friday afternoon saw its fair share of excitement. Despite Baldwin being bedridden for the final draw and handing skip duties to Jack Geddes, Alberta would secure at least a tiebreaker berth as Geddes skipped Alberta to a 10–6 victory over Nova Scotia. Manitoba trailed Prince Edward Island 3–2 at the halfway point, but Manitoba would outscore PEI 8–1 in the second half for a 10–4 win, thus forcing a tiebreaker playoff. Ontario could've made it a three-way tiebreaker, but they couldn't recover after a 6–1 deficit after five ends against Northern Ontario and proceeded to lose 9–6, thus Alberta and Manitoba would be the two teams playing for the Brier Tankard in the tiebreaker match that evening.

Baldwin's return in the tiebreaker playoff against Manitoba on Friday evening proved to be a huge difference. Alberta would score three in the first end and would put the game out of reach as they took a 6–1 lead with two in the third and a steal of one in the forth and would go onto defeat Manitoba 10-6 securing Baldwin's place in Brier history.

Teams
The teams are listed as follows:

Round-robin standings

Round-robin results
All draw times are listed in Pacific Time (UTC-08:00)

Draw 1
Monday, March 3 3:00 PM

Draw 2
Monday, March 3 8:00 PM

Draw 3
Tuesday, March 4 9:30 AM

Draw 4
Tuesday, March 4 2:30 PM

Draw 5
Wednesday, March 5 3:00 PM

Draw 6
Wednesday, March 5 8:00 PM

Draw 7
Thursday, March 6 9:00 AM

Draw 8
Thursday, March 6 3:00 PM

Draw 9
Thursday, March 6 8:00 PM

Draw 10
Friday, March 7 9:30 AM

Draw 11
Friday, March 7 3:00 PM

Playoff 
Friday, March 7

Shot percentages were calculated based on the points scored via the source provided.

Notes

References

External links 
 Video: 

Macdonald Brier, 1958
Macdonald Brier, 1958
The Brier
Curling competitions in British Columbia
Macdonald Brier
Macdonald Brier
Sports competitions in Victoria, British Columbia